Green River National Wildlife Refuge is a National Wildlife Refuge located in Kentucky across from Evansville, Indiana where the Green River joins the Ohio River.

At its debut as the 568th National Wildlife Refuge in 2019, it consisted of 10 acres of land donated by the Southern Conservation Corp. The Fish and Wildlife Refuge has a goal of acquiring 24,000 acres in a 52,000 acre Conservation Partnership Area.

External links
 Refuge website

References

National Wildlife Refuges in Kentucky
Protected areas of Henderson County, Kentucky
Green River (Kentucky)
Protected areas established in 2019
2019 establishments in Kentucky